The New Orleans Saints' flagship radio stations are WWL AM 870 and WWL-FM 105.3.  WWL 870 is a 50,000 watt clear channel station, the most powerful in New Orleans.  The radio network has affiliates in numerous cities around Louisiana, Mississippi and Arkansas.

Current Staff
Mike Hoss (play-by-play), Deuce McAllister (color commentator), and Kristian Garic (sideline reporter) form the broadcast team.  Former Saints quarterback Bobby Hebert hosts the post-game call-in show, "The Point After," and also performs pre-game and halftime commentary.

Past Staff
Veteran sportscaster Al Wester served as the Saints' play-by-play announcer during its first four seasons (1967–1970). Longtime announcer Jim Henderson has led the broadcast team almost continuously since the mid-1980s, his tenure covering the franchise's periods of greatest success.  Henderson announced his retirement following the 2017 season.  One week later, Wester died at age 93.

Over the years, color commentators have included such notable former Saints players as quarterback Archie Manning, wide receiver Danny Abramowicz, and running backs Jim Taylor, Hokie Gajan, and Deuce McAllister.

References

 
New Orleans Saints
broadcasters